NewsDay is a Harare-based Zimbabwean independent daily newspaper published since 2010. It began publishing on 4 June 2010 and is based in Harare. It carries the slogan Everyday News for Everyday People  on its logo.

See also
 Media of Zimbabwe

References

2010 establishments in Zimbabwe
Mass media in Harare
Newspapers published in Zimbabwe
Publications established in 2010